is a Japanese judoka.

He participated at the 2018 World Judo Championships, winning a medal.

References

External links
 

1993 births
Living people
Japanese male judoka
World judo champions
Universiade gold medalists for Japan
Universiade bronze medalists for Japan
Universiade medalists in judo
Medalists at the 2015 Summer Universiade
21st-century Japanese people